Prosopis glandulosa, commonly known as honey mesquite,  is a species of small to medium-sized, thorny shrub or tree in the legume family (Fabaceae).

Distribution
The plant is primarily native to the Southwestern United States and Northern Mexico. Its range extends on the northeast through Texas and into southwestern Kansas and Oklahoma and northwestern Louisiana, and west to southern California.

It can be part of the Mesquite Bosque plant association community in the Sonoran Desert ecoregion of California and Arizona (U.S.), and Sonora state (México), and in the Chihuahuan Desert of New Mexico and Texas in the US, and Chihuahua in Mexico.

Description

Prosopis glandulosa has rounded big and floppy, drooping branches with feathery foliage and straight, paired spines on twigs. It is considered to have a medium growth rate.

It flowers from March to November, with pale, yellow, elongated spikes and bears straight, yellow seedpods. The seeds are eaten by a variety of animals, such as scaled quail. Other animals, including deer, collared peccaries, coyotes, cactus mice, and jackrabbits, feed on both pods and vegetation.

Varieties
 Prosopis glandulosa var. glandulosa (syn. Prosopis chilensis var. glandulosa (Torr.) Standl., Prosopis juliflora var. glandulosa (Torr.) Cockerell)
 Prosopis glandulosa var. torreyana (L.D.Benson) M.C.Johnst. (syn. Prosopis juliflora var. torreyana L.D.Benson)

Invasive species
Prosopis glandulosa has been intentionally introduced into at least a half-dozen countries, including Australia, Botswana, Namibia and South Africa.  The IUCN considers it as one of the world's 100 worst invasive species outside its native habitat range.

The seeds are disseminated by livestock that graze on the sweet pods, and the shrubs can invade grasslands, with cattlemen regarding mesquites as range weeds to be eradicated. Due to latent buds underground, permanent removal is difficult. Cutting them will only coppice them: A single-trunked tree that is cut down will soon be replaced by a multi-trunked version.

Uses
Prosopis glandulosa shrubs and trees provide shelter and nest building material for wildlife, and produce seed pods in abundance containing beans that are a seasonal food for diverse birds and small mammal species. As the common name indicates, honey mesquite is a honey plant that supports native pollinator species of bees and other insects, and cultivated honey bees. It is a larval host for the long-tailed skipper and Reakirt's blue butterflies.

Mesquite flour is high in protein, low in carbohydrates, and can be used in recipes as a gluten-free substitute for wheat flour.

Within its native range in southwestern North America, its wood smoke is used to flavor meats when cooked over a mesquite fire. This is particularly popular in Texas in the US.

In Namibia, although an invasive species, it has qualities that have made it useful for humans, including: growing extremely rapidly there, having very dense shade, abundantly producing seed pods, and a readily available firewood.

Indigenous peoples
The indigenous peoples of California and southwestern North America used parts of Prosopis glandulosa as a medicinal plant, food source, building and tools material, and fuel.
The Cahuilla ate the blossoms and pods, which were ground into meal for cake. The Pueblo peoples of New Mexico in the southwest United States use the seeds to produce mesquite flour for making traditional horno bread.
The thorns of the plant were used as tattoo needles, and the ashes for tattoos, by the Cahuilla and Serrano Indians of Southern California. Its dense and durable wood is prized for making tools and arrow points, and for the unique flavor it lends to foods cooked over it. The deep taproots, often larger than the trunks, are dug up for firewood.

This species of mesquite, known as haas (pronounced ) by the Seri people of northwestern Mexico, was very important for food and nonfood uses. The Seris had specific names for various stages of the growth of the mesquite pod. Historically, it was a very important wild food plant because it fruits even during drought years.

References

External links

USDA Plants Profile for Prosopis glandulosa (honey mesquite)
 Calflora Database: Prosopis glandulosa (Honey mesquite)
Lady Bird Johnson Wildflower Center NPIN−Native Plant Information Network: Prosopis glandulosa (Honey mesquite)
 UC CalPhotos gallery

glandulosa
Flora of the Sonoran Deserts
Flora of the Chihuahuan Desert
Flora of the California desert regions
Flora of Northeastern Mexico
Flora of Northwestern Mexico
Flora of the Southwestern United States
Flora of the South-Central United States
Flora of the Rio Grande valleys
North American desert flora
Trees of the Southwestern United States
Trees of the South-Central United States
Trees of the North-Central United States
Trees of Baja California
Trees of Chihuahua (state)
Trees of Coahuila
Trees of Tamaulipas
Natural history of the Colorado Desert
Natural history of the Mojave Desert
Flora of the Mexican Plateau
Plants described in 1827
Plants used in Native American cuisine
Plants used in traditional Native American medicine
Forages
Edible legumes